Mikhail Yuryevich Simonov (Russian: Михаил Юрьевич Симонов, born 1959) is a Russian direct marketing pioneer and personified communications expert, president of Silver Mercury advertising and marketing festival, the member of Silver Archer Russia Awards jury, Russian Association of Marketing Services president and Association of Russian Communications Agencies Vice-president.

Early life 

Simonov began his commercial activities in 1987.

Career 
He founded the Poster Publicity agency in 1993 (Russia Direct holding since 2000, Russian Association of Marketing Services since 2007) and Russian Association of Direct Marketing in 1994. He became the president of this Association and brought it to the world market over 15 years. 

Simonov became the president of the Russian Association of Marketing Services in 2009 and offered his plan of marketing services reformation in Russia. He founded Kotler Awards in 2014 as the award for the best achievements in Russian marketing and advertising.

In 1990s Simonov was the political strategist of Russian politicians Yegor Gaidar, Victor Chernomyrdin and Boris Yeltsin. Simonov was the first to propose using personal letters and personal communications during election campaigns. He is a member of the Consultative Council of Authority for Personal Data Subjects Rights.

Books

References

Living people
1959 births
Date of birth missing (living people)
Place of birth missing (living people)
Russian advertising executives
Russian political consultants
20th-century Russian businesspeople
21st-century Russian businesspeople